SDCC may refer to:

Organizations

San Diego 
San Diego Christian College, a private, conservative evangelical Christian college located in El Cajon, California
San Diego City College, a public, two-year community college located in San Diego, California
San Diego Comic-Con, a four-day event held during the summer in San Diego, California
San Diego Convention Center, the primary convention center in San Diego, California

Elsewhere 
South Dartmoor Community College, a co-educational State Comprehensive Trust School located in Ashburton, Devon, England
South Dublin County Council, Ireland
Stoke Damerel Community College, a maths and computing college on Somerset Place in Stoke, Plymouth, England
Sutherland District Cricket Club, a cricket club of Sutherland, Sydney, Australia

Technology 
Secure Direct Client-to-Client, an IRC-related sub-protocol
Small Device C Compiler, an open source, partially retargetable C compiler for microcontrollers